Irving Cohn (21 February 1898 in London – 12 July 1961 in Fort Lee, New Jersey) was a British-American songwriter, best known for "Yes! We Have No Bananas", which he co-wrote with Frank Silver in 1923. He is sometimes credited as Irving Conn.

References

External links
 

1898 births
1961 deaths
American male songwriters
British emigrants to the United States
English songwriters
Musicians from London
20th-century American male musicians